Kasturi Angela Chellaraja Wilson is a businesswoman and the first female Group CEO of a public quoted conglomerate in Sri Lanka. At present she is the Managing Director of Hemas Pharmaceuticals PVT LTD and Hemas Surgicals and Diagnostics PVT LTD; subsidiaries of Hemas Holdings PLC. On 25 June 2020, it was announced that she would take over as Group CEO of Hemas Holdings PLC from current Group CEO, Steven Enderby; effective 1 October 2020. It was also announced that Kasturi would be appointed as a Non-Executive Director of Hemas Holdings PLC, effective from 1 July 2020.

Kasturi is a single mother of two boys; Ashvindh and Amrith Wilson and she has also Captained the National Basketball Team in 1989.

Career 

Kasturi, is a former student of Holy Family Convent, Bambalapitiya. She is also an avid sportswoman and was an active Member of the National Netball and Basketball Teams.  A Fellow of the Chartered Institute of Management Accountants and an alumna of the Executive Leadership Program at Harvard Business School, Kasturi started her career at Someswaran Jayewickreme & Co. (currently, Deloitte) in 1987 as an Audit Trainee. She also served as an Audit Manager and as Director Consultancy prior to being appointed as Financial Controller at Aramex Airborne Lanka. For a brief period, she also served as Financial Controller at Confifi Hotels. She became a member of Hemas Holdings PLC in March 2002. She initially joined the organization as Director Finance at HemTours (currently, Diethelm Travels) and continued to hold many senior management positions, including Head of the Group's Shared Services Unit, Vishwa BPO Chief Process Officer and Managing Director of the Hemas Transportation Sector. Her portfolio also included Hemas Aviation, Hemas Logistics and Hemas Maritime Services. In 2016, she was appointed as the Managing Director of Hemas Pharmaceuticals, Hemas Surgicals and Hemas Diagnostics.

Kasturi was appointed as a Non-Executive Director of Capital Alliance Limited in 2018. She also serves on the Board of Morison PLC and on the Board of Hemas Consumer Brands. Kasturi is also the first female to be elected as President of the Sri Lanka Chamber of the Pharmaceutical Industry (SLCPI). She is also a main Committee Member of the Ceylon Chamber of Commerce (CCC), a Member of the Sub-Committee on Economic, Fiscal and Policy Planning of the Chamber and also serves as a Member of the National Agenda Committee for Logistics and Maritime of the Chamber. Kasturi has also served on the Boards of Chartered Institute of Management Accountants, Sri Lanka and the American Chamber of Commerce in Sri Lanka.

On 7 August 2019, she was voted to be elected as the new President of the Sri Lanka Chamber of the Pharmaceutical Industry replacing Shyam Sathasivam.

Awards 

In 2019, Kasturi was recognised as being one of the twelve Top Women Change-Makers in the country by the Parliament of Sri Lanka and USAID. Kasturi was also the recipient of the Career Role Model Award in 2013 by Women in Management, Sri Lanka and the IFS; a World Bank Group. In 2016, she also won the Women Super Achiever Award at the World Women Leadership Congress Awards, India.

References 

Sri Lankan businesspeople
Sri Lankan accountants
Sri Lankan netball players
Sri Lankan women activists
Sri Lankan women academics
Sri Lankan feminists
Alumni of Holy Family Convent, Bambalapitiya
Year of birth missing (living people)
Living people